is a Japanese idol who is a former member of AKB48 who was part of Team B and later Team K. She has appeared in a number of television shows, feature films and stage productions.
Kobayashi is represented with Promage.

On July 8, 2021, Kobayashi announced her marriage to a non celebrity boyfriend who works as an investor. She gave birth to a son in March 16, 2022.

On January 17, 2023, she announced on her social media that her divorce was completed and will focus on her efforts of raising her child as a single mother.

AKB48 discography

Singles

Albums

Theatre performances

Publications

Videos

Filmography

TV drama

TV variety

Other TV programmes

Films

Stage

Radio

Internet

Music videos

Events

Dubbing
The Lost City (Allison (Patti Harrison))

Bibliography

Photobooks

Magazine serialisations

Calendars

Others

Notes

References

External links
 
 
Kana Kobayashi on 755 

AKB48 members
Japanese idols
1991 births
Living people
Musicians from Saitama Prefecture
21st-century Japanese women singers
21st-century Japanese singers
21st-century Japanese actresses